Code Blue is the sixth studio album by the Australian rock/synthpop band Icehouse and was released in November 1990 by Regular Records. Code Blue peaked at #7 on the Australian album charts.

Track listing 
All songs written by Iva Davies and Robert Kretschmer except where noted. Songwriters according to Australasian Performing Right Association (APRA).

Personnel 
Credited to:

Icehouse members
 Iva Davies – vocals, guitars, keyboards, oboe, bagpipes
 Simon Lloyd – saxophone, keyboards, programming
 Stephen Morgan – bass
 Paul Wheeler – drums

Additional musicians
 Mark Azzopardi – backing vocals
 Mary Azzopardi – backing vocals
 Kevin Bennett – backing vocals
 Robert Burke – saxophone
 The Cove Chamber Orchestra — strings
 Sandy Evans  – saxophone
 Sean Kelly – backing vocals
 Wendy Matthews – backing vocals
 James Morrison – trumpet
 Mark Punch – backing vocals
 James Valentine – saxophone

Recording details
 Studio/s: Trackdown and Rhinoceros Studios, Rich and EMI Studios 301 Sydney
 Arranger (brass, strings) – Iva Davies
 Engineer – Nick Launay
 Assistants – James Cadsky, Nich Hartley, Peter Lees, Adrian Webb, Kristen Wolek
 Mastered – Tony Cousins @ The Town House, London, England.
 Mixed – Nick Launay, Iva Davies (bonus tracks)
 Producer – Nick Launay, Iva Davies (bonus tracks)
 Digital remastering (2002) – Iva Davies, Ryan Scott

Art work
 Cover Concept – Iva Davies
 Art Director – David Barnes
 Photography – Hugh Stewart

Charts

Certifications

References 

1990 albums
Icehouse (band) albums
Albums produced by Nick Launay
Regular Records albums